

National team

National student team
5th World University Futsal Championship 1996 in Jyväskylä, Finland

Futsal European Clubs Championship

Top League

5th Russian futsal championship 1996/1997

Promotion tournament

National Cup

Final Four

Top League Cup

Final Four

First League. Division A

1tst union Russian second level futsal division 1996/1997

First League. Division B

First stage

Second stage

Group 1
Games played in Mihnevo and Nizhnekamsk. One game between Sport-Express and MFK Spartak (SK Perovo) played in Moscow.

Final stage
KrAZ Krasnoyarsk withdraw before the final tournament, Voronezh would like to replace them, but sometimes later they withdraw too.

Women's League
5th Russian women futsal championship 1996/1997

Women's National Cup

References

Russia
Seasons in Russian futsal
futsal
futsal